Calumenin is a protein that in humans is encoded by the CALU gene.

Calumenin (CALU) is a  calcium-binding protein localized in the endoplasmic reticulum (ER) and is involved in such ER functions as protein folding and sorting. Calumenin is a member of the EF-hand superfamily in the ER and Golgi apparatus named CERC. CERC is an acronym for its family members Cab-45, reticulocalbin, Erc-55 (RCN2), and calumenin. The CALU gene encodes a deduced 315-amino acid protein containing 6 EF-hand motifs, 1 potential N-glycosylation site, and a C-terminal ER retention signal. The human and mouse CALU proteins are 98% identical. CALU mRNA is ubiquitously expressed in human tissues and maps to 7q32.

References

External links

Further reading

EF-hand-containing proteins